Vanderson Scardovelli (born 27 September 1984) is a Brazilian professional footballer who plays as a left back.

Club career
Vanderson started his career at Corinthians, he signed a three-year contract on 5 April 2004.

He was on loan to Ituano of Brazilian Série B, and São Bento of Campeonato Paulista.

On 10 July 2007, he signed a one-year contract with Campo Grande of Campeonato Carioca Terceira Divisão, which de facto associated with his agent Pedrinho VRP.

On 23 August 2007, he was on loan to Siena, and then spent other loan spells in Italy with Martina and Treviso.

In the summer of 2012 Vanderson signed for Azerbaijan Premier League side Khazar Lankaran on a one-year contract.
Vanderson won his first piece of silverware with Khazar on 23 October 2013, after helping them to victory over Neftchi Baku in the 2013 Azerbaijan Supercup. Vanderson left Khazar Lankaran in December 2014, after having his contract cancelled by the club.

After being released by Khazar Lankaran, Vanderson signed a short-term contract with Brazilian side Paulista.

Career statistics

Honours
Khazar Lankaran
 Azerbaijan Supercup: 2013

Notes

References

External links
 Brazilian FA Database
 http://www.gazzetta.it/speciali/2008/calcio/Players/player_p210989.shtml

1984 births
Living people
Footballers from São Paulo (state)
Brazilian footballers
Brazilian expatriate footballers
Sport Club Corinthians Paulista players
Ituano FC players
Esporte Clube São Bento players
A.C.N. Siena 1904 players
Treviso F.B.C. 1993 players
Expatriate footballers in Italy
Expatriate footballers in Greece
Expatriate footballers in Azerbaijan
A.S.D. Martina Calcio 1947 players
PAS Giannina F.C. players
PAS Lamia 1964 players
Panserraikos F.C. players
Serie B players
Super League Greece players
Football League (Greece) players
Azerbaijan Premier League players
Brazilian expatriate sportspeople in Italy
Brazilian expatriate sportspeople in Greece
Brazilian expatriate sportspeople in Azerbaijan
Association football fullbacks